Bellow may refer to:

People 
 Adam Bellow, vice president/executive editor at Collins Books
 Alexandra Bellow (born 1935), mathematician
 Saul Bellow (1915–2005), American writer born in Canada of Russian-Jewish origin
 PEN/Saul Bellow Award for Achievement in American Fiction, awarded biennially by the PEN American Center

Other uses 
 Bellow (album), the second album by folk duo Spiers and Boden
 Bellows, a device for controlled delivery of pressurized air.
 Bellow's Regiment of Militia, also known as the 16th New Hampshire Militia Regiment 
 Bellow Island, an island in Lake Michigan
 Vociferation

See also
 Bello (disambiguation)
 Bellows (disambiguation)